Mortier is a pipe organ builder.

Mortier may also refer to:

 Mortier (surname)
 Mortier, Newfoundland and Labrador, Canada
 French destroyer Mortier, a Claymore-class destroyer built for the French Navy